I'll Get Along (foaled March 11, 1992, in Kentucky) is a Thoroughbred racehorse by champion sprinter Smile and out of the stakes-winning Foolish Pleasure mare Don't Worry Bout Me, tracing tail female to the mother of all blue hens, La Troienne. She was selected and purchased for Roy and Patricia Chapman by trainer Bob Camac for $40,000 at the 1993 Keeneland September yearling sale.

Trained by Camac, I'll Get along was a stakes winner of $277,009 but is best known as a broodmare through her mating to Elusive Quality that produced Smarty Jones, the 2004 Kentucky Derby and Preakness Stakes winner who was voted American Champion Three-Year-Old Male Horse honors.

In 2004, I'll Get Along was sold for $5,000,000 to Gaines-Gentry Thoroughbreds, then in foal with an Elusive Quality filly. At Coolmore Stud in Ireland, she was bred to Champion sire, Sadler's Wells.  She has since produced a second stakes winner, the turf sprinter filly Smartys Emperoress by Holy Roman Emperor.

Progeny 
 Be Happy My Love (PA), 1999 filly by Formal Gold;
 Smarty Jones (PA), 2001 colt by Elusive Quality;
 Sippin' Bourbon (FL), 2003 colt by Hennessy - shipped to Australia;
 Speedy Jones (FL), 2004 colt by Orientate;
 Elusive Moment (KY), 2005 filly by Elusive Quality;
 Maytide (IRE), 2006 colt by Sadler's Wells;
 Attractive (IRE), 2007 filly by Sadler's Wells;
 Smartys Emperoress (KY), 2008 filly by Holy Roman Emperor;
 Gointobegone (KY), 2009 filly by Smart Strike;
 Cuadrante (KY), 2010 colt by Henrythenavigator

References
 I'll Get Along's pedigree plus photo

1992 racehorse births
Racehorses trained in the United States
Racehorses bred in Kentucky
Thoroughbred family 1-x